Marisa Guterman, an American actress, film director, screenwriter, producer, and singer-songwriter, appears in the leading role of Miriam in Shredderman Rules, for which she was nominated for a 2008 Young Artist Award, Leading Young Actress, TV Movie, MiniSeries or Special. She was named one of "30 Under 30: Musicians to Know," along with Grammy Best New Artist winner Esperanza Spalding, following a worldwide search by splashlife.com.

Filmography

Film

Television

External links

DEADLINE
SPLASHLIFE

Living people
American film directors
American film actresses
American television actresses
American women singer-songwriters
American child actresses
1988 births
21st-century American singers
21st-century American women singers